Hebeloma theobrominum is a species of agaric fungus in the family Hymenogastraceae. Described as new to science in 1987, it is found in Europe. It is the type species of Hebeloma section Theobromina, which includes H. alboerumpens,  H. erumpens, H. griseopruinatum,  H. parvicystidiatum,  H. plesiocistum, and H. vesterholtii.

See also
List of Hebeloma species

References

theobrominum
Fungi described in 1987
Fungi of Europe